The 2004 Prince Edward Island Scott Tournament of Hearts was held Jan. 22–27 in at the Cornwall Curling Club in Cornwall, Prince Edward Island. The winning team was Team Suzanne Gaudet who represented Prince Edward Island, finished with a 2-9 round-robin record at the 2004 Scott Tournament of Hearts in Red Deer, Alberta.

Teams

Draw 1
January 22, Time TBA AT

Draw 2
January 23, 7:00 PM AT

Draw 3
January 24, 2:00 PM AT

A Side Final
January 24, 7:00 PM AT

Draw 4
January 24, 7:00 PM AT

Draw 5
January 25, 2:00 PM AT

B Side Final
January 25, 7:00 PM AT

Draw 6
January 25, 7:00 PM AT

Draw 7
January 26, 2:00 PM AT

C Side Final
January 26, 7:00 PM AT

Playoffs

Semi-final
January 27, 2:00 PM AT

Final
January 26, 7:00 PM AT

References

Prince Edward Island Scott Tournament Of Hearts, 2004
2004 in Prince Edward Island
Curling competitions in Prince Edward Island